William Anderson VC (28 December 1882 – 13 March 1915) was a Scottish recipient of the Victoria Cross, the highest and most prestigious award for gallantry in the face of the enemy that can be awarded to British and Commonwealth forces. He was posthumously awarded the VC during the First World War for his actions during the Battle of Neuve Chapelle in March 1915.

Early life
Anderson was born in Dallas, Moray in Scotland on 28 December 1882 to Alexander and Bella Anderson. The family later moved to Forres, where he was educated at Forres Academy. After completing his education, he moved to Glasgow and was employed as a car conductor with the Corporation Tramways for several years.

In 1905, Anderson enlisted in the British Army, joining the 2nd Battalion, Yorkshire Regiment, also known as the Green Howards, for a seven-year period of service; his brother James was already serving with the battalion. William would spend time in Egypt, South Africa, and British India, on the North West Frontier. After his period of service ended, Anderson returned to Glasgow and was employed in the Elder Hospital in Govan. By this stage, he was engaged and planned to emigrate to South Africa.

First World War
Anderson was still living in England, having not yet completed his move to South Africa, when the First World War broke out. As he was a reservist, he was soon called up to the British Army. In November 1914, he rejoined the 2nd Battalion, Yorkshire Regiment, the battalion that he had previously served with, which was now on the Western Front in France as part of the 7th Division. By this stage, he was an acting corporal.

In March 1915, the 7th Division was involved in the Battle of Neuve Chapelle. It entered the fighting on 11 March, during which time Anderson was one of a group of men involved in a bombing raid. He was involved in another bombing raid the next day, when his company tried to retake ground lost to the Germans the previous day. It was for this action that he was awarded the Victoria Cross (VC). The VC, instituted in 1856, was the highest award for valour that could be bestowed on a soldier of the British Empire. The citation read as follows:

His VC award was gazetted in May 1915, but by then Anderson was dead, having been killed in action on 13 March 1915. His remains were never found, and he is commemorated on the Le Touret Memorial.

Medal
As Anderson's parents were deceased, his brother Alexander was presented with Anderson's VC by Lieutenant General Francis Davies, the former commander of the 7th Division, in a ceremony at Edinburgh Castle on 19 May 1920. Several years later, the VC was donated to the Green Howards Regimental Museum in Richmond, Yorkshire. He is remembered on the Forres War Memorial and on 15 March 2015, a commemorative tablet in Anderson's honour was laid at the war memorial at Dallas, where he was born.

Notes

References

External links
Burial location of William Anderson "France"
Location of William Anderson's Victoria Cross "Green Howards Museum"

British World War I recipients of the Victoria Cross
Green Howards soldiers
British Army personnel of World War I
British military personnel killed in World War I
1880s births
1915 deaths
People from Moray
British Army recipients of the Victoria Cross